Fabian Beqja (born 15 February 1994 in Durrës) is an Albanian professional footballer who currently plays as a midfielder for Kosovar club Gjilani.

Club career
Beqja started his career at hometown club Teuta Durrës, where in 2011 he joined the under-19 side at the age of 17 and became a regular in the squad, scoring 2 goals in 21 games. The following season, he scored 15 goals in 27 games and which attracted the attention of the senior team who called him up at the start of the 2013–14 season.

He made it his debut at senior team on 23 October 2013 in the Albanian Cup against Besëlidhja Lezhë, as he included in the starting line up then getting substituted off in the 50th minute for Erjon Mustafaj and the match finished in the victory 1–2. 
First league debut came on 8 December 2013 against Flamurtari Vlorë as he came in as a substitute in the 58th minute in place of Da Silva Buiu and the match finished in the loss 2–0.

International career
He made it his international debut, with the Albania U-21 on 5 March 2014 against Austria U-21 as he came in as a substitute in the 63rd minute in place of Gjelbrim Taipi, the match finished in the away victory 1–3.

References

External links
 

1994 births
Living people
Footballers from Durrës
Albanian footballers
Association football forwards
Association football midfielders
KF Teuta Durrës players
Besa Kavajë players
Kategoria Superiore players